Krunoslav Hulak (25 May 1951 – 23 October 2015) was a Croatian-Yugoslavian chess player. He was awarded the International Master title in 1974, and the grandmaster title in 1976 by FIDE.

Career
Hulak won the Yugoslav Chess Championship in 1976 and the Croatian Chess Championship in 2005.

His other notable tournament performances have been:
Varna 1974 equal 1st
Lublin 1976 equal 2nd
Amsterdam IBM tournament 1977 2nd
Osijek 1980 equal 1st
Sombor 1980 equal 1st
Budva 1981 2nd
Banja Luka 1983 equal 1st
Zagreb 1985 2nd
Wijk aan Zee-B 1986 1st
Banja Luka 1987 equal 1st
Solin 2000 2nd

He played twice in the interzonal tournaments, finishing 11th at Toluca 1982 and 12th at Zagreb 1987.

Hulak played thrice for Yugoslavia (1982, 1986, 1990) and thrice for Croatia (1992, 1994, 1996) in the Chess Olympiad.

References

Tužna vijest za hrvatski šah: Bio je omiljen...

External links

Krunoslav Hulak chess games at 365Chess.com

1951 births
2015 deaths
Chess grandmasters
Croatian chess players
Yugoslav chess players
Sportspeople from Osijek
Burials at Mirogoj Cemetery